Poocha Sanyasi is a 1981 Indian Malayalam-language film, directed by Hariharan. The film stars Sukumari, Rajkumar, Bahadoor and Balan K. Nair. The film's score was composed by K. J. Yesudas.

Cast

Sukumari
Rajkumar
Bahadoor
Balan K. Nair
Jayamalini
Kuthiravattam Pappu
Madhavi
Oduvil Unnikrishnan
P. K. Venukkuttan Nair
Priya
Ragini
Reena
Ummer
Pappu

Soundtrack
The music was composed by K. J. Yesudas with lyrics by Poovachal Khader and Mankombu Gopalakrishnan.

References

External links
 

1981 films
1980s Malayalam-language films
Films directed by Hariharan